Joel Mwaka (born March 16, 1960) is a Tanzanian politician and a member of the Chama Cha Mapinduzi political party. He was elected MP representing Chilonwa in 2015.

Reference 

Living people
1960 births
Chama Cha Mapinduzi politicians
Tanzanian MPs 2015–2020
Chama Cha Mapinduzi MPs